Greg Pitt (born 15 July 1989 in Wolverhampton) is a British slalom canoeist who competed at the international level from 2006 to 2015.

He won two bronze medals in the C2 team event at the ICF Canoe Slalom World Championships, earning them in 2013 and 2015. He also won a gold medal in the same event at the 2012 European Canoe Slalom Championships in Augsburg.

His partner in the C2 boat from 2010 to 2015 was Adam Burgess.

References

External links

1989 births
English male canoeists
Living people
Sportspeople from Wolverhampton
Medalists at the ICF Canoe Slalom World Championships